Deedsville is an unincorporated community in Union Township, Miami County, in the U.S. state of Indiana.

History
In 1870, the railroad was extended to the site of Deedsville. Deedsville was laid out and platted in July 1870 by Albert Deeds and Ryan “Deed” Driscoll. A post office has been in operation at Deedsville since 1870.

References

Unincorporated communities in Miami County, Indiana
Unincorporated communities in Indiana